Tembandumba was a ruler of the Jaga of what is now Angola. 

Tembandumba's mother was Mussasa, whom she rebelled against and declared herself queen. After taking power, she organized the Jaga for war by demanding that infants be killed by their mothers and their bodies pounded into ointment, which was mixed with herbs. In order to enforce this decree, she assembled the tribe and pounded her own infant son to death on a mortar and prepared the ointment. She then rubbed it on her body, declaring that it would make her invulnerable. The women of the tribe immediately imitated her actions with their own children. She eventually encountered resistance to this practice in the tribe, and had to resort to using only male infants captured in war for the ointment. 

Tembandumba was described as being repulsive and having only one eye, having lost the other in battle. According to a 1910 European source, she would take lovers, but would kill them after a brief dalliance. She was eventually poisoned by one of her lovers.

External links
"The Amazons: Chapter VII: Amazons of Africa" URL accessed 08/04/06

Succession

African women in war
17th-century monarchs in Africa
17th-century women rulers
Angolan rebels
Women rulers in Africa
Queens regnant in Africa
Rebellions in Africa
Women in 17th-century warfare
Deaths by poisoning